Midget are an English pop-rock band from Stamford, Lincolnshire, England, who formed in 1996. The trio released the mini-album "Alco-pop" and the albums Jukebox, Individual Inconsistent and The Milgram Experiment. Two of their singles made the UK Singles Chart in 1998 ("All Fall Down" reached No. 57 and "Invisible Balloon" No. 66). They disbanded in 2001 to work on individual projects, but reformed in 2006. On 18 September 2006, Midget played their first London gig in nearly six years at the Social.

Discography
Studio albums
 Alco-Pop (1997)
 Jukebox (1998)
 Individual Inconsistent (2000)
 The Milgram Experiment (2004)

References

External links
Official site
Official MySpace page
Midget's official fan-site

English pop music groups
English indie rock groups
Music in Lincolnshire
People from Stamford, Lincolnshire
Radar Records artists
Sire Records artists